The 1963 Brabantse Pijl was the third edition of the Brabantse Pijl cycle race and was held on 3 April 1963. The race started and finished in  Brussels.

General classification

References

1963
Brabantse Pijl